Dr. Bird's Advice for Sad Poets is a 2021 American comedy-drama film written and directed by Yaniv Raz and starring Lucas Jade Zumann, Taylor Russell, Chase Stokes, Lisa Edelstein, David Arquette and Jason Isaacs.  It is based on the novel of the same name by Evan Roskos.

Cast
Lucas Jade Zumann as James Whitman
Taylor Russell as Sophie
Jason Isaacs as Carl
Lisa Edelstein as Elly
David Arquette as Xavier
Chase Stokes as Martin
Tom Wilkinson as the voice of Dr. Bird

Release
The film was released on demand on January 12, 2021.

Reception
The film has an 80% rating on Rotten Tomatoes based on five reviews.

Sandie Angulo Chen of Common Sense Media awarded the film three stars out of five and wrote, "YA dramedy about anxiety has language, innuendo, drinking."

Cath Clarke of The Guardian also awarded the film three stars out of five and wrote, "The family dysfunction stuff is sensitively handled with some originality..."

Cyntia Vinney of Comic Book Resources gave the film a positive review and wrote, "None of this would land, however, if it weren’t for Zumann’s earnest, heartfelt performance. He perfectly balances James' anxiety with his underlying sweetness as well as his awkward idiosyncrasy."

Glenn Kenny of The New York Times gave the film a negative review and wrote, "The movie gets so drunk on its stylistic affectations (and unfunny attempts at cerebral comedy) that by the time it sobers up to take James's mental health seriously, it's too little, too late."

References

External links
 
 
 

2021 films
2021 comedy-drama films
2020s French-language films
American comedy-drama films
Films based on American novels
2020s English-language films
2021 multilingual films
American multilingual films
2020s American films